The Prize Winner of Defiance, Ohio is a 2005 American biographical film written and directed by Jane Anderson. It is based on the book by Terry Ryan, and stars Julianne Moore, Woody Harrelson, and Laura Dern. The film received a limited release on October 14, 2005.

Plot
The Prize Winner of Defiance, Ohio is based on the true story of housewife Evelyn Ryan, who helped support her husband, Kelly, and their 10 children by winning jingle-writing contests. Kelly failed to support his family, in part due to apparent alcoholism and low self-esteem. He dreamed of being a singer, but lost his singing voice in a car accident, and was often cruel and abusive.

Evelyn wins a large freezer, ice buckets, a washer, and dryer set, a trip to New York City, sleds, boots, a pony, a palm tree, a window, a sports car, a shopping spree in her local grocery store, ice crushers, a camera, dance shoes, a boat motor, pogo sticks, a case of dog food, and a lifetime supply of bird seed. Kelly, who feels like his role as provider for the family is being threatened, criticizes Evelyn, and damages the prizes she wins. Their children side with her. Kelly gets angry at Evelyn, and accidentally knocks her over while she is carrying 12 full glass bottles of milk, causing her to nearly sever a ligament. Evelyn is able to talk him down after each incident, and, temporarily at least, he treats her better. As time passes, the older children start moving out for college and participating in sport career, lessening some burdens to the family. 

Evelyn is largely isolated because of the hours she has to spend caring for the children, and the lack of local intellectual equals. However, she is contacted by a group of other contest-entering mid-western housewives, and befriends them. Ultimately, Evelyn discovers that Kelly had secretly taken out a second mortgage on their house and never made payments on it, leaving the family subject to an almost-certain foreclosure. The children pray for their mother's miraculous victory in a contest sponsored by Dr Pepper. She wins, and pays the mortgage on the house.

Years later, it is revealed that after Kelly died, Evelyn finds out that he has placed his pension checks in a bank account especially for her to make up all the failures he made as a husband and father. The actual Ryan children are then shown as adults.

Cast
Julianne Moore as Evelyn Ryan
Woody Harrelson as Leo "Kelly" Ryan
Laura Dern as Dortha Schaefer
Trevor Morgan as Bruce
Simon Reynolds as Ray the Milkman
Monte Gagne as Lee Ann Ryan
Jordan Todosey as Young Tuff Ryan
Ellary Porterfield as Tuff Ryan

Critical reception
The film received mixed reviews, garnering a 60% approval rating on film review aggregator Rotten Tomatoes, with an average score of 6.10/10, based on 84 reviews. The site's consensus states: "Noteworthy for Julianne Moore's performance, Prize Winner is nonetheless a largely indistinct and tentative film that fails to convey the true power of its bittersweet tale." Metacritic reported a score of 58/100 (citing "mixed or average reviews"), based on reviews from 28 critics.

Roger Ebert of the Chicago Sun-Times gave the film three-and-a-half out of four stars, remarking that the movie "avoids obvious sentiment and predictable emotion, and shows this woman somehow holding it together year after year, entering goofy contests that, for her family, mean life and death".

Home media
The film was released on DVD on March 14, 2006, with DreamWorks taking distribution, instead of their independent banner, Go Fish Pictures, which had theatrical rights to this film.

References

External links

 

Evelyn Ryan's Official site
The Prize Winner of Defiance Web Site by Terry Ryan

2005 films
American biographical drama films
2005 biographical drama films
DreamWorks Pictures films
Films about domestic violence
ImageMovers films
Revolution Studios films
Films directed by Jane Anderson
Films with screenplays by Jane Anderson
Films scored by John Frizzell (composer)
2005 drama films
2000s English-language films
Films produced by Robert Zemeckis
2000s American films